2013 Academy Awards may refer to:

 85th Academy Awards, the Academy Awards ceremony which took place in 2013
 86th Academy Awards, the Academy Awards ceremony which took place in 2014 honoring the best in film for 2013